The 2017 Butler Bulldogs football team represented Butler University in the 2017 NCAA Division I FCS football season. They were led by 12th-year head coach Jeff Voris and played their home games at the Bud and Jackie Sellick Bowl. They played as members of the Pioneer Football League. They finished the season 6–5, 4–4 in PFL play to finish in a tie for sixth place.

Schedule

Source:

Game summaries

at No. 20 Illinois State

at Franklin

Taylor

at San Diego

Drake

at Morehead State

Jacksonville

Campbell

at Dayton

at Stetson

Valparaiso

References

Butler
Butler Bulldogs football seasons
Butler Bulldogs football